Peter Amey (born 3 August 1935) is a British wrestler. He competed in the men's freestyle welterweight at the 1960 Summer Olympics.

He also represented England and won a bronze medal in -68 kg welterweight, at the 1962 British Empire and Commonwealth Games in Perth, Western Australia. Eight years later he participated in the 1970 British Commonwealth Games in Edinburgh, Scotland.

References

External links
 

1935 births
Living people
British male sport wrestlers
Olympic wrestlers of Great Britain
Wrestlers at the 1960 Summer Olympics
Sportspeople from Plymouth, Devon
Wrestlers at the 1962 British Empire and Commonwealth Games
Wrestlers at the 1970 British Commonwealth Games
Commonwealth Games competitors for England